Venus de Milo is a statue believed to have been carved by Alexandros of Antioch.

Venus de Milo may also refer to:

Music
"Venus de Milo", a song by D.I. (band)
"Venus De Milo", Leander & Mills, hit for Bob Manning (pop singer)
"Venus de Milo", a jazz standard by Gerry Mulligan covered by Miles Davis in 1949
"Venus de Milo", a song by Michael Nyman from And Do They Do/Zoo Caprices
"Venus de Milo", a song by Prince from Parade (Prince album)
"Venus De Milo", a song by Television (band), covered by Blondie

Fictional characters
Venus (Teenage Mutant Ninja Turtles), a fictional character